The 2017 Marburg Open was a professional tennis tournament played on clay courts. It was the eighth edition of the tournament which was part of the 2017 ATP Challenger Tour. It took place in Marburg, Germany between 3 and 8 July 2017.

Singles main-draw entrants

Seeds

 1 Rankings are as of 26 June 2017.

Other entrants
The following players received wildcards into the singles main draw:
  Jaime Fermosell Delgado
  Benjamin Hassan
  Julian Lenz
  Kai Wehnelt

The following players received entry from the qualifying draw:
  Matthias Bachinger
  David Pichler
  Tim Pütz
  João Pedro Sorgi

Champions

Singles

  Filip Krajinović def.  Cedrik-Marcel Stebe 6–2, 6–3.

Doubles

  Máximo González /  Fabrício Neis def.  Rameez Junaid /  Ruan Roelofse 6–3, 7–6(7–4).

External links
Official Website

Marburg Open
2017
2017 in German tennis